Peneplain Peak is a  summit located in British Columbia, Canada.

Description
It is the fifth-highest point in the Coquitlam Ranges. Precipitation runoff from the mountain's east slope drains into Widgeon Creek, thence Pitt River; and from the west slope into the Coquitlam River watershed. The mountain's toponym, well-established in the mountaineering community, was officially adopted May 3, 1951, by the Geographical Names Board of Canada. It is pronounced "PENNa plane."

Climate
Based on the Köppen climate classification, Peneplain Peak is located in the marine west coast climate zone of western North America. Most weather fronts originate in the Pacific Ocean, and travel east toward the Coast Mountains where they are forced upward by the range (Orographic lift), causing them to drop their moisture in the form of rain or snowfall. As a result, the Coast Mountains experience high precipitation, especially during the winter months in the form of snowfall. Winter temperatures can drop below −20 °C with wind chill factors below −30 °C. The months July through September offer the most favorable weather for climbing Peneplain Peak.

See also

 Geography of British Columbia
 Geology of British Columbia

References

External links
 Weather: Peneplain Peak 

One-thousanders of British Columbia
Pacific Ranges
New Westminster Land District
Coast Mountains